Vít Krejčí (born 19 June 2000) is a Czech professional basketball player for the Atlanta Hawks of the National Basketball Association (NBA).

Early life and career
Krejčí was born in Strakonice, Czech Republic and played basketball for the youth academy of Sokol Pisek. At age 14, he joined Spanish basketball club Zaragoza. In the 2016–17 season, he began playing for Anagan Olivar, the reserve team of Zaragoza, in the Liga EBA.

Professional career

Basket Zaragoza (2017–2021)
On 5 March 2017, at 16 years and eight months of age, Krejčí made his professional debut for Zaragoza against Fuenlabrada. He tied with Sergi García as the second-youngest debutant in club history, behind Carlos Alocén. On 17 April 2020, Krejčí declared for the 2020 NBA draft. In the 2019–20 season, Krejčí averaged 3.2 points in 9.2 minutes per game and was named to the ACB All-Young Players Team. On 25 September 2020, he suffered a season-ending left knee injury in a game against Real Madrid.

Oklahoma City Thunder (2021–2022)
Krejčí was selected with the 37th overall pick by the Washington Wizards in the 2020 NBA draft and subsequently traded to the Oklahoma City Thunder. On 28 January 2021, he signed with the Oklahoma City Blue, the Thunder's NBA G League affiliate, where he rehabbed the ACL injury he sustained in Zaragoza.

On 2 September 2021, Krejčí signed a multi-year deal with the Thunder.

Atlanta Hawks (2022–present) 
On 27 September 2022, Krejčí was traded to the Atlanta Hawks in exchange for Maurice Harkless and draft considerations.

Career statistics

NBA

|-
| style="text-align:left;"| 
| style="text-align:left;"| Oklahoma City
| 30 || 8 || 23.0 || .407 || .327 || .864 || 3.4 || 1.9 || .6 || .3 || 6.2
|- class="sortbottom"
| style="text-align:center;" colspan="2"| Career
| 30 || 8 || 23.0 || .407 || .327 || .864 || 3.4 || 1.9 || .6 || .3 || 6.2

National team career
Krejčí represented the Czech Republic on several occasions at the youth level. He was named to the All-Star Five of the 2019 FIBA U20 European Championship Division B in Matosinhos, Portugal after averaging 14.9 points, 5.1 rebounds and 5.1 assists, leading his team to the silver medal. In February 2019, Krejčí made his debut for the senior national team during the 2019 FIBA Basketball World Cup qualification stage.

References

External links
 Liga ACB profile

2000 births
Living people
Atlanta Hawks players
Basket Zaragoza players
Czech expatriate basketball people in Spain
Czech men's basketball players
Liga ACB players
Oklahoma City Blue players
Oklahoma City Thunder players
People from Strakonice
Point guards
Washington Wizards draft picks
Sportspeople from the South Bohemian Region